Prayag Bhati (born 24 September 1991) is an Indian cricketer. He made his first-class debut for Maharashtra in the 2012–13 Ranji Trophy on 29 December 2012.

References

External links
 

1991 births
Living people
Indian cricketers
Maharashtra cricketers
Cricketers from Mumbai